Vladimir John Ondrasik III (born January 7, 1965), also known by his stage name Five for Fighting, is an American singer-songwriter and pianist. He is best known for his piano-based soft rock ballads, such as the top 40 hits "Superman (It's Not Easy)" (2001), "100 Years" (2003)  "The Riddle" (2006). He also had a string of moderate hits on the adult contemporary charts in the late 2000s and into the 2010s, including "World" (2006) and "Chances" (2009).

Ondrasik has recorded six studio albums, one EP, and several live albums as Five for Fighting. Ondrasik's song "Superman" was nominated for a Grammy in 2002. The singer has had songs featured in 350 films, TV shows and advertisements.

Early years
Ondrasik was born in Los Angeles, California, a child of a musical family. He is of Slovak descent. His mother was a piano teacher who taught at John F. Kennedy High School in Granada Hills, Los Angeles, where he graduated. He learned the piano as a child.  In his teens, he learned to play the guitar and started to write music. While he also learned to sing opera briefly, he soon decided that he would like to be a singer and songwriter.

While in college, Ondrasik continued to pursue music in his spare time. He graduated from UCLA with a degree in applied science and mathematics.

Career

Early musical career (1988–1995) 
After graduating from UCLA in 1988, Ondrasik became associated with the glam metal scene. He befriended Whitesnake bassist Rudy Sarzo and later formed a hair metal band with Scott St. Clair Sheets, best known for his work with Pat Benatar, called John Scott. Ondrasik later described the band's genre as "pop metal", comparing their sound to Bon Jovi. John Scott signed a management deal in the early 1990s, but any hopes of mainstream success were shattered with the rise of grunge and the decline of the hair metal genre.

Although John Scott did not release a studio album at the time, three songs co-written by Sheets and Ondrasik later appeared on a 1997 arena rock album from Sheets' band, St. Clair, which also featured Sarzo. Ondrasik did not perform on the album, but received writing credits for "After the Fire", "Shadow of Myself", and "Turn the Wheel". Sheets and Ondrasik would collaborate again much later, in 2008, when Ondrasik provided vocals for Sheets' song "Fly Me Away".

After John Scott parted ways, Ondrasik says he then "went back to the piano, where I belonged."

Ondrasik spent the early 1990s playing singer-songwriter gigs around Los Angeles. He signed with a music publisher, Carla Berkowitz, who discovered him in a bar on Melrose and Vine. Ondrasik and Berkowitz later married.

Becoming "Five for Fighting" and first album (1995–1999)
In 1995, Ondrasik signed with EMI Records. He adopted Five for Fighting as a "band name" that same year at the request of EMI executives, who found Ondrasik's name difficult to pronounce. "Five for Fighting" is an ice hockey expression that means a five-minute major penalty for participating in a fight. Ondrasik is a lifelong fan of the National Hockey League's Los Angeles Kings.

Five for Fighting's first album, Message for Albert, was released by EMI in March 1997. However, EMI Records' American division closed that June. Although the album itself had already been released, there were no singles from Message. "Bella's Birthday Cake" was intended as the lead single, judging by the existence of radio promos and demos featuring the song. The song "Ocean" appears alongside "Bella's Birthday Cake" on some promotional cassettes, suggesting it was viewed as a potential second single.

AllMusic called Message for Albert "intelligent and well-crafted", concluding that it was "a promising debut that sadly lost its shot when EMI spontaneously combusted after the record's release."

Five for Fighting left EMI in the aftermath and recorded demos of "Easy Tonight" and "Jainy", both of which were re-recorded for 2000's America Town album. Capitol Records later re-released Message after the success of America Town.

Breakthrough and peak commercial success (2000–2006) 
Aware Records' Mark Cunningham made initial contact with Ondrasik. Cunningham then passed Ondrasik's demos to the label's new A&R Steve Smith. After a discussion with Aware head Gregg Latterman, Smith met with Ondrasik and set up a deal in partnership with Columbia Records.

His second album, America Town, was released on September 26, 2000. In addition to 10 all-new songs, America Town included two re-recorded songs from the ill-fated Message for Albert album ("The Last Great American" and "Love Song"). "Easy Tonight" became the album's lead single in 2000. It received moderate airplay and peaked at 26 on the Adult Top 40.

The second single, "Superman (It's Not Easy)", was a commercial success, reaching number 14 on the Billboard Hot 100 chart and number 1 on the Adult Top 40. The song became an anthem after the September 11 attacks and Ondrasik performed the song at The Concert for New York City on October 20, 2001. "Superman" was nominated for a Grammy in 2002.

After the success of "Superman", two more songs were released as singles – the title track "America Town" and "Something About You" in 2002 and 2003, respectively – but neither song charted. While America Town did not reach the top 50 of the Billboard 200 chart, the album eventually was certified Platinum.

His third album, The Battle for Everything, debuted at number 20 on Billboard 200 chart in February 2004. Some versions of the album were paired with a bonus CD, a five-song EP called 2 + 2 Makes 5. Battle included the single "100 Years", which reached number one on the Billboard Adult Contemporary chart and stayed at number one for 12 non-consecutive weeks. "Devil in the Wishing Well" was the album's second single, reaching number 23 on the Adult Top 40. A third single, a cover of "Silent Night" from the 2 + 2 Makes 5 EP, reached number 2 on the US Adult Contemporary charts.

The Battle for Everything was certified Platinum by the RIAA, making it Five for Fighting's second straight Platinum-selling album. It received mixed reviews from critics, with AllMusic praising the record's "nice craftsmanship" and noting that it was "one of the more interesting, detailed" records in its genre. However, AllMusic was critical of the "pompous narcissism" of the lyrics, calling Ondrasik "deadly serious". Todd Goldstein of PopMatters also criticized the album's "pomposity", but enjoyed "Angels and Girlfriends" for its "unexpected chord changes" and "uncharacteristically quirky" lyrics. He singled out "The Taste" for its surprising energy, writing that during "the only pure guitar-rocking song among the twelve midtempo ballads, John Ondrasik screams. It's a raucous, Howlin' Pelle Almqvist moment of sheer unselfconscious exuberance." Another writer said Ondrasik seemed like a "contradictory figure" for his blend of romanticism and irreverence on The Battle for Everything: "There's '100 Years,' the first single, a meditation on the poetry of time passing. But then there's 'The Taste,' whose delicate opening gets pulverized by slashing electric guitar and a raw, screaming vocal." According to Ondrasik, when recording Battle, he and producer Bill Bottrell "were ambitious to the point of absurdity. If we wanted drama, we'd get a thirty-piece orchestra. If we wanted a rock edge, we went after it with reckless abandonment."

Continued mainstream success (2006–2009) 
Two years later, the album Two Lights was released; this became his first career top 10 album, debuting at number eight on the Billboard 200 chart in August 2006. Its first single, "The Riddle", became Ondrasik's third career top 40 hit on the Billboard Hot 100 chart, peaking at number 40. It reached number three on AC charts and number seven on Hot AC charts. The second single, "World", reached number 14 on Hot AC charts and the music video has been used to raise funds for various charities and as a theme for NASA's International Space Station (see Philanthropy below).

Five for Fighting released three live albums in 2007: Rhapsody Originals in January, iTunes Exclusive in June, and Back Country in October.

His fifth studio album, titled Slice, was released on October 13, 2009, and appeared on the iTunes top 10 albums on the first day. The album was produced by Gregg Wattenberg ("Superman", "100 Years"). Academy Award-winning composer Stephen Schwartz, who penned the songs for musicals such as Wicked, Godspell and Pippin, co-wrote the title track, as well as the track "Above the Timberline". On July 21, 2009, the first single from Slice, called "Chances", was released for digital download. "Chances" was featured during the end credits of the hit film The Blind Side. "Chances" reached number 11 on the Hot AC radio chart.

Later career (2010–present) 
On May 27, 2010, Ondrasik announced that he had left Columbia Records and his album Slice would be re-released on Wind-up Records along with the song "Slice" being released as a single in July 2010.

On February 20, 2011, Five for Fighting performed at the 2011 NHL Heritage Classic in Calgary, with the Calgary Flames facing off against the Montreal Canadiens.

A compilation album called The Very Best of Five for Fighting was released in 2011. It featured 14 songs in chronological order of their recording, beginning with "Bella's Birthday Cake" from 1997 and ending with 2010's "Slice".

Five for Fighting's sixth studio album, Bookmarks, was released in 2013, peaking at 54 on the Billboard 200. "What If" was the album's lead single and it reached 29 and 28 on the Adult Top 40 and Adult Contemporary charts, respectively.

Ondrasik wrote and recorded the original song "All for One" for the one hundredth episode of the television series Hawaii Five-0. The song was released as a single on November 7, 2014, the same date the episode aired. His song "100 Years" was featured in the final scene of the final episode of the TV series JAG.

On September 12, 2016, Five for Fighting released the single "Born to Win". The song debuted during the opening montage of the season eight finale of American Ninja Warrior.

Five for Fighting performed as part of the Lincoln Center Series, American Songbook, in February 2017. He also performed his song "All for One" at the National Memorial Day Concert on the steps of the Capitol in 2017. He performed "Superman" during the National Memorial Day parade the next day.

Ondrasik is the featured artist in season three of the CBS drama Code Black, contributing his take on Gary Go's "Open Arms" in episode one. He also appears on screen performing the song. His song "Superman (It's Not Easy)" performed by Briana Lee was featured in the season three finale.

In 2018, Ondrasik recorded a song entitled "The Song of Innocents" for the end credits of the film Gosnell: The Trial of America's Biggest Serial Killer.

In 2020, Ondrasik re-recorded an unplugged version of "All for One" that was featured in the series finale of Hawaii 5–0. He also released a demo from 2006 called "China on the Horizon", a song speaking to the geopolitical threat of China. In June 2020 Ondrasik released a cover version of "Amazing Grace" which he performed live on the BYUTV show "Grace Notes".

On September 13, 2021, Ondrasik recorded "Blood on My Hands", a song critical of the withdrawal of American troops from Afghanistan. Ondrasik wrote of the song:

On the day 13 of our soldiers and over 60 Afghans were killed by a suicide bomber I sat down to write this song. After our last soldier left Afghanistan, I received a call from a friend organizing rescue evacs of "AM-CITS" and SIV holders. It was a highly emotional call and moment of clarity. Private citizens now had the burden of risking their lives to rescue Americans and Afghan allies that our government left behind. America has broken her promise, but these brave Americans have not.

In March 2022, Ondrasik released Can One Man Save the World? Ondrasik wrote of the song:

Like so many of you, I am inspired and in awe of President Zelensky, his wife Olena, and the Ukrainian people. Their courage and determination in the face of the Russian onslaught gives hope and fortitude to all freedom loving people. In Zelensky I sense we are witnessing a modern day, Winston Churchill. It may make you ask yourself; Can One Man Save The World?

Ondrasik performed Can One Man Save the World on July 9, 2022 in Kyiv, Ukraine with the Ukraianian Orchestra. Ondrasik said
I was honored to perform my new Ukraine tribute song Can One Man Save the World? with the Ukrainian Orchestra in the ruins of the Antonov Airport—in front of the Ukrainians’ beloved Mriya, the world’s largest cargo plane that Russia destroyed at the outset of the war. In sharing this musical collaboration on such hallowed ground, I saw firsthand the fortitude and grace of the Ukrainian people, who whether playing a violin or driving a tank, will not be deterred by Putin’s atrocities and aggressions.”

Musical style and influences 
Ondrasik has been variously compared to other piano singer-songwriters like Elton John, Billy Joel, Dave Matthews, and Ben Folds, albeit "while still maintaining a harder rock edge exclusive to Five For Fighting." His more heartland rock-oriented tracks have been compared to those of Bruce Springsteen and Tom Petty. Ondrasik lists Queen (and Freddie Mercury in particular), Steve Perry, Stevie Wonder, Elton John, Billy Joel, and Prince among his musical influences.

Ondrasik makes heavy use of falsetto vocals in his music, with Variety describing this as "a pleasant two-tone voice -- a tenor for setting up a situation and a higher register for driving a point home". In addition to piano, Ondrasik plays the harmonica and acoustic guitar. He also plays electric guitar on studio recordings of some songs. While Five for Fighting's singles prominently feature piano, his early albums contain songs with traditional hard rock influences ("Happy" on Message for Albert, "Boat Parade" on America Town, "The Taste" on The Battle for Everything, and others). Grunge influences can also be heard in earlier albums, such as in "Wise Man" on Message for Albert, "Michael Jordan" on America Town, and a non-album song called "Big Cities". Accordingly, Ondrasik has acknowledged Nirvana as one of his influences.

On his style at the turn of the millennium, when "Superman" became his first mainstream hit, Ondrasik said, "I kind of fancy myself as a rocker and a rock guy and here was this ballad." Even though the song was softer than his style at the time, Ondrasik is "so grateful that I had that chance to be heard with that song. It will always be my first born."

Five for Fighting's live performances take a variety of forms: sometimes Ondrasik appears alone, switching between acoustic guitar and piano. Five for Fighting sometimes appears with touring musicians on bass, electric guitar, and drums. Five for Fighting also began playing orchestral shows in the early 2010s, often accompanied by a string quartet; Ondrasik has also appeared with the backing of full symphony orchestras for these shows. He often covers songs like "American Pie", "Rocket Man", "Message in a Bottle", and "Bohemian Rhapsody" at the end of live performances. Five for Fighting has released a steady stream of live recordings since 2007, including six live albums and EPs.

Legacy 
Referring to Five for Fighting's success in the 2000s, AllMusic called Ondrasik "one of the decade's leading balladeers". Five for Fighting has released two Platinum-selling albums, America Town and The Battle for Everything, and received one Grammy nomination.

Five for Fighting was a nominee for Favorite Adult Contemporary Artist at the 2003 American Music Awards.

Ondrasik was named a top five AC and a top 10 Hot AC artist for the 2000s.

Professional speaking
In 2012, Ondrasik became active on the public speaking circuit. Presenting on themes of creativity, entrepreneurship, and collaboration, Ondrasik uses his music, life as a musician and working in the family business to highlight his message. He has presented at TEDx, The Salk Institute, American Cancer Society, and Virgin Unite amongst others.

Philanthropy
In the spring of 2007, Ondrasik created his first video charity website, launching his whatkindofworlddoyouwant.com/  The website allowed fans to upload videos answering the central question, "What Kind of World Do You Want?" (taken from his hit song "World"). The site raised over $250,000 for Augie's Quest, Autism Speaks, Fisher House Foundation, Save the Children, and Operation Homefront.

Ondrasik, under the auspices of the United Service Organizations (USO), performed for service members on a USO/Armed Forces Entertainment tour of Guantánamo Bay and other bases in Cuba in February and March 2007. He followed up with another USO tour in November 2007 of Japan, Guam and Hawaii. "I am struck by the sacrifices the troops and their families make for our way of life and I felt it was important to show my support", says Ondrasik.

In November 2007, Ondrasik coordinated the release of 13 free songs for US military members called CD for the Troops. There have been five CDs for the troops and over one million copies given away. The songs donated included tracks from Billy Joel, Jewel and Sarah McLachlan. Subsequent volumes became available in 2008 (including songs by Gretchen Wilson, Keith Urban and Trace Adkins), 2009 (an album of comedy tracks with material from comedians such as Chris Rock, Ray Romano and Adam Sandler), 2010 (featuring songs by Matchbox 20, Brandi Carlile, Ingrid Michaelson, and Gavin DeGraw), and 2011 (artists including Sara Bareilles, Mayday Parade and REO Speedwagon).

Ondrasik has also performed on the annual Jerry Lewis MDA Labor Day Telethon and has done various events for the Muscular Dystrophy Association and Augie's Quest, raising awareness and funds for ALS (Lou Gehrig's disease).

In 2008, he got involved in the musical movement of spreading awareness about current slavery and human trafficking by performing a live version of "World" for the rockumentary, Call + Response.

The song "What If" was used in the tenth-anniversary campaign of Richard Branson's non-profit, Virgin Unite.

The singer received a special fatherhood award from the National Fatherhood Initiative's 2009 Military Fatherhood Award Ceremony. He received the International SPA Association's Humanitarian Award in 2016.

In 2022 the singer launched a docu-series called Meet the Heroes interviewing Americans involved with the Afghan withdrawal. The first episode featured Michael Waltz

In February 2022 Ondrasik joined Tom Morello, Victoria Williams, Beth Hart, and others on the song God Help Us Now about Afghan girls suffering in Afghanistan.

Personal life
Ondrasik currently lives with his wife and their two children near Los Angeles, California. He is an avid hockey and basketball fan, supporting the L.A. Kings and Lakers. He has been a contributing writer for both Sports Illustrated and the official L.A. Kings and is often featured on radio and TV interviews. He has performed on SportsCenter, at the 2002 NHL All-Star Game, 9/11/11 Jets v. Cowboys Halftime, 2011 Heritage Classic, 2011 Carrier Classic, 2014 Stadium Series in Los Angeles, and performed "100 Years" during Landon Donovan's last game of the LA Galaxy.

When not songwriting or composing, he is involved in his family’s shopping cart manufacturing business Precision Wire Products, based in Commerce, California.

Ondrasik's first car was a 1965 Ford Mustang that he painted purple due to his affinity for Prince. Ondrasik later restored the car to its original powder blue color scheme. He still owns the car and wrote a song about it called "65 Mustang", which appears on the Two Lights album. The car also appears in the music video for "The Riddle" and on the cover art for "Chances".

Ondrasik is an Independent voter. He was a registered Republican prior to 2016. He has described himself as fiscally conservative. 

His year of birth has been subject to some confusion, with Encyclopedia.com listing his birth year as 1968 instead of 1965. A 2001 Los Angeles Times article refers to him being 33 at the time rather than 36. A March 2002 interview from the Pittsburgh Post-Gazette gives his age as 33 at the time rather than 37. However, Ondrasik himself has implied that the 1965 date is the correct one, such as in 2020 when he referred to recently turning 55.

Discography

Studio albums

Live albums

Compilation albums

Singles

Music videos

References

External links

 

1965 births
Living people
20th-century American male singers
20th-century American singers
21st-century American male singers
21st-century American singers
American male guitarists
American male pianists
American male pop singers
American people of Slovak descent
American pop guitarists
American pop pianists
American pop rock singers
American rock guitarists
American rock pianists
American rock singers
American soft rock musicians
APRA Award winners
Musicians from Los Angeles
Philanthropists from California
Singers from California
University of California, Los Angeles alumni
Wind-up Records artists
Columbia Records artists
Nettwerk Records artists
EMI Records artists